The Greek Basket League Best Coach, or Greek Basket League Coach of the Year, is an annual award for the best coach of each season of Greece's top-tier level professional basketball club league, the Greek Basket League.

Best Coaches

Notes:
 There was no awarding in the 2019–20, due to the coronavirus pandemic in Europe.

References

External links
 Official Greek Basket League Site 
 Official Greek Basket League YouTube Channel 
 Official Hellenic Basketball Federation Site 
 Basketblog.gr 
 GreekBasketball.gr 

Greek Basket League
Best Coach
European basketball awards